Humboldt is a neighborhood in the North and Northeast sections of Portland, Oregon. It is bordered by the neighborhoods of Piedmont to the north, King to the east, Boise to the south, and Overlook to the west.

See also
 Portland foreclosure protest
 North Portland Library

References

External links
 
Humboldt Street Tree Inventory Report

 
Neighborhoods in Portland, Oregon
North Portland, Oregon
Northeast Portland, Oregon